Following are the results for the 1994–95 Belgian First Division professional association football season.  R.S.C. Anderlecht won the title of the 1994–95 season.

Relegated teams

These teams were relegated to the second division at the end of the season:
K.V. Oostende
R.F.C. Liégeois

Final league table

Results

Top goal scorers

References

Belgian Pro League seasons
Belgian
1994–95 in Belgian football